Henry "Harry" Patterson (27 July 1929 – 9 April 2022), commonly known by his pen name Jack Higgins, was a British author. He was a best-selling author of popular thrillers and espionage novels. His novel The Eagle Has Landed (1975) sold more than 50 million copies and was adapted into a successful 1976 movie of the same title.

Some of his other notable books are A Prayer for the Dying (1973), The Eagle Has Flown (1991), Thunder Point (1993), Angel of Death (1995), Flight of Eagles (1998), and Day of Reckoning (2000). His 85 novels in total have sold more than 250 million copies and have been translated into 55 languages.Jack Higgins

Early life
Jack Higgins was born Henry Patterson on 27 July 1929 in Newcastle upon Tyne to an English father and a Northern Irish mother. When his father abandoned them soon afterward, his mother returned with him to her home town of Belfast, Northern Ireland, to live with her mother and her grandfather on the Shankill Road. Raised amid the religious and political violence of Belfast, Patterson learned to read at the age of three, when he was tasked with reading The Christian Herald to his bed-ridden grandfather. At night, he would crouch beneath a window and read by the light of street lamps.

When his mother remarried, the family relocated to Leeds, West Yorkshire, England, where Patterson won a scholarship to attend Roundhay Grammar School for Boys. He proved to be an indifferent student and left school with few formal qualifications. In 1947 he began two years of national service, at first with the East Yorkshire Regiment, and later as a non-commissioned officer of the Royal Horse Guards Regiment of the Household Cavalry doing security work on the East German border.

After leaving the army, he returned to education at Beckett Park teacher training college in Leeds and studied for a BSc sociology degree as a London School of Economics external student, taking his finals in Bradford in 1961. By day, he was working as a driver and labourer at night. He chose the university for its "history of nonconformism". He received his third-class degree after three years of study. After getting a teaching qualification, he started teaching at Allerton Grange Comprehensive School. He accepted a job lecturing in social psychology and criminology. He taught liberal studies at Leeds Polytechnic and education at James Graham College, which became part of Leeds Polytechnic in 1976.

Career

In 1959, Higgins began writing novels. One of his aliases was James Graham. The growing success of his early work allowed him to take time off from his teaching, which he quit eventually to become a full-time novelist.

Patterson's early novels, using his own name (as "Harry Patterson") as well as the pseudonyms James Graham, Martin Fallon, and Hugh Marlowe, are thrillers that typically feature hardened, cynical heroes, ruthless villains, and dangerous locales. Patterson published thirty-five such novels (sometimes three or four a year) between 1959 and 1974, learning his craft. East Of Desolation (1968), A Game For Heroes (1970) and The Savage Day (1972) are notable among his early work for their vividly described settings (Greenland, the Channel Islands, and Belfast, respectively) and offbeat plots.

Patterson began using the pseudonym Jack Higgins during the late 1960s; his first minor bestsellers were published during the early 1970s, two contemporary thrillers The Savage Day and A Prayer for the Dying, but it was the publication of his thirty-sixth book, The Eagle Has Landed, in 1975, that made Higgins' reputation. Its plot concerns a German commando unit sent into England to kidnap Winston Churchill. The main character is arguably an Irish gunman and poet, Liam Devlin. Higgins followed The Eagle Has Landed with a series of thrillers, including several (Touch The Devil, Confessional, The Eagle Has Flown) featuring the character Devlin.

The third phase of Patterson's career began with the publication of Eye of the Storm in 1992, a fictionalised retelling of an unsuccessful mortar attack on Prime Minister John Major, by a ruthless young Irish gunman-philosopher named Sean Dillon, hired by an Iraqi millionaire. Cast as the main character for the next series of novels (22 out of 43 published between 1992 and 2017), it is apparent that Dillon is in many ways an amalgamation of Patterson's previous heroes—Chavasse with his flair for languages, Nick Miller's familiarity with martial arts and jazz keyboard skills, Simon Vaughan's Irish roots, facility with firearms and the cynicism that comes with assuming the responsibility of administering a justice unavailable through a civilised legal system.

Personal life and death
Higgins met Amy Hewitt while both were studying at the London School of Economics. They were married in 1958, soon after he received a £75 advance for his first novel—"the biggest wedding present we could have had." They had four children: Sarah (born 1960), Ruth (born 1962), Sean (born 1965), and Hannah (born 1974). Their daughter Sarah Patterson authored the novel The Distant Summer (1976). The marriage ended in 1984. In 1985, he married his second wife, Denise Palmer. 

Higgins died at his home in Jersey, on 9 April 2022, at the age of 92.

Bibliography

Filmography

References

External links
 
 
 The Unofficial Jack Higgins Homepage
 Jack Higgins Blog
 Author's page at HarperCollins Publishers
 Guide to Jack Higgins thrillers

1929 births
2022 deaths
20th-century English male writers
20th-century English novelists
20th-century pseudonymous writers
21st-century English male writers
21st-century English novelists
21st-century pseudonymous writers
Academics of Leeds Beckett University
Alumni of the London School of Economics
Anglicans from Northern Ireland
Blues and Royals soldiers
English male novelists
English people of Northern Ireland descent
English thriller writers
Jersey writers
Writers from Newcastle upon Tyne
People from Northern Ireland of English descent
Writers from Belfast
Writers from Leeds